Meridianul Românesc is a Romanian-American newspaper published weekly in the Romanian language. It has no political or religious affiliation, but aims to be the voice of the Romanian-American community, as stated in its editorial policy. It was founded in March, 1973 by Marius Ligi. The newspaper is published from Anaheim, California by Meridianul Românesc Incorporated. The standard length of an issue is 36 pages, at a current retail price of $1.25 an issue.

The newspaper has contributing writers from the United States, Romania, Israel, France, and Germany, among others.

See also
List of Romanian newspapers (Romanian newspapers published in Romania).

Romanian-language newspapers
Romanian-American culture